is a park in the  of Tama-ku, Kawasaki, Kanagawa Prefecture, Japan. On display in the park is a collection of 20 traditional  (farm houses) from various parts of Japan, especially thatched-roofed houses from eastern Japan. Of these, nine have received the designation of Important Cultural Assets from the national government. The houses are varied, and include examples from regions of heavy snow, lodgings for travellers, and a theatrical stage. Visitors can see regional variety and differences in construction.

The park is operated by the city of Kawasaki. Admission is free to visitors who are not older than junior-high-school age. The entrance is a fifteen-minute walk from Mukogaoka-Yuen Station on the Odakyu Odawara Line.

See also
 Historic Villages of Shirakawa-gō and Gokayama

External links
Ikuta Ryokuchi Park (in English/Japanese)
Kawasaki City Nihon Minka-en (in English/Japanese)
Ikuta Green Park (old page in English)

Parks in Japan
Open-air museums in Japan
Buildings and structures in Kawasaki, Kanagawa
Parks and gardens in Kanagawa Prefecture
Museums in Kanagawa Prefecture
Vernacular architecture in Japan
Thatched buildings